Falsexocentrus carinipennis is a species of beetle in the family Cerambycidae, and the only species in the genus Falsexocentrus. It was described by Breuning in 1970.

References

Acanthocinini
Beetles described in 1970
Monotypic Cerambycidae genera
Taxa named by Stephan von Breuning (entomologist)